is a subway station on the Tokyo Metro Yūrakuchō Line in Toshima, Tokyo, Japan, operated by the Tokyo subway operator Tokyo Metro. The station is numbered "Y-10". It opened on October 30, 1974.

Lines
Higashi-Ikebukuro Station is served by the Tokyo Metro Yūrakuchō Line and is 12.4 km from the starting point of the line at Wakoshi Station.

Station layout
The station has one island platform on the second basement ("B2F") level serving two tracks.

Platforms

History
The station opened on 30 October 1974 with the opening of the initial section of the Yūrakuchō Line between Ikebukuro and Ginza-itchome stations.

Passenger statistics
In fiscal 2016, the station was used by an average of 42,752 passengers daily. The passenger figures for previous years are as shown below.

Surrounding area
 Higashi-Ikebukuro-yonchōme Station on the Toden Arakawa Line
 Sunshine City
 Toshima Post Office

See also
 List of railway stations in Japan

References

External links

  

Railway stations in Japan opened in 1974
Stations of Tokyo Metro
Tokyo Metro Yurakucho Line
Railway stations in Tokyo